KBOS may refer to:

 Logan International Airport (ICAO location indicator: KBOS), serving Boston, Massachusetts, United States.
 KBOS-FM, a radio station licensed to Tulare, California, United States.
 KBOs, Kuiper belt objects

See also

 
 KBO (disambiguation)